Melissa Paola Borjas Pastrana (born 20 October 1986), known as Melissa Borjas, is a Honduran football referee. Borjas earned a degree in Finance at Universidad Nacional Autónoma de Honduras, and has been a professional referee since 2011.

In 2015, she became the first Honduran woman to referee at the FIFA Women's World Cup when she officiated a match between Japan and Ecuador.

Borjas was the first female referee to officiate a match in Liga Nacional de Fútbol Profesional de Honduras, the top flight of men's football in the country. Borjas then became the first female official to referee a final match in Liga Nacional de Fútbol Profesional de Honduras when she officiated the first leg of the 2019 spring final between local teams Olimpia and Motagua on 26 May 2019.

On 3 December 2018, it was announced that Borjas had been appointed to be a referee for the 2019 FIFA Women's World Cup in France. After the conclusion of the round of 16, FIFA announced that Borjas was selected as one of 11 referees who would be assigned to matches during the final 8 matches of the tournament.
In the 2020 Olympic games she notoriously disallowed a goal from Australian Superstar Sam Kerr eliminating Australia from Gold and Silver Medal contention. This will forever be known as the Matildas “invisible foul”.

References

Living people
1986 births
Honduran football referees
FIFA Women's World Cup referees
Women association football referees
Sportspeople from Tegucigalpa
Universidad Nacional Autónoma de Honduras alumni
Women referees and umpires